Vegueros, from Pinar del Río Province, repeated as champions in the playoffs of the 27th Cuban National Series. La Habana and Santiago de Cuba possessed stellar regular seasons in which they won 80% of their games. However, Vegueros, with an all-star lineup including Luis Giraldo Casanova and Omar Linares, prevailed in the playoffs.

Standings

Playoffs

References

 (Note - text is printed in a white font on a white background, depending on browser used.)

Cuban National Series seasons
Cuban National Series
Base
Base